Morning Tide is the debut full-length album by the band The Little Ones. It was released on July 28, 2008 on CD, digital download and 7" vinyl.

Track listings
"Morning Tide" 4:03
"Ordinary Song" 3:37
"Boracay" 3:31
"All Your Modern Boxes" 3:04
"Tangerine Visions" 3:00
"Gregory's Chant" 3:15
"Everybody's Up to Something" 4:41
"Waltz" 3:20
"Rise & Shine" 3:15
"Like a Spoke On a Wheel" 3:59
"Farm Song" 5:46

References

External links
The Little Ones official website
Review of Morning Tide

2008 debut albums
The Little Ones (band) albums
Heavenly Recordings albums